Marie Zieu Chino (1907–1982) was a Native American potter from Acoma Pueblo, New Mexico.  Marie and her friends Lucy M. Lewis and Jessie Garcia are recognized as the three most important Acoma potters during the 1950s. Along with  Juana Leno, they have been called "The Four Matriarchs" who "revived the ancient style of Acoma pottery." The inspiration for many designs used on their pottery were found on old potsherds gathered to use for temper. Together they led the revival of ancient pottery forms including the Mimbres, Tularosa and other various cultures in the Anasazi region. This revival spread to other potters who also accepted the old styles, which led to new innovative designs and variations of style and form.

In 1922, Marie won her first award at the Santa Fe Indian Market at the age of fifteen.  She went on to receive numerous awards for her pottery from 1970-1982. In 1998 the Southwestern Association for Indian Arts recognized Marie with a “Lifetime Achievement Award.”

Marie became particularly well known for her fine-line black-on-white pottery and vases with the step design. Her pots were distinctive in their complex geometric designs as well as the combination of life forms and abstract symbols.  Some of her favorite designs include: Mimbres animals, Tularosa swirls, Acoma parrots, rainbows, bushes with berries, leaves, rain, clouds, lightning and fine-line snowflakes.

Marie was the matriarch of the Chino family of potters. She helped her children and grandchildren learn the fine art of pottery making and had many students. Marie had five daughters who were potters, "of whom Grace, Carrie and Rose achieved reputations as excellent potters." Pottery by her daughter Vera Chino is held by the Holmes Museum of Anthropology.

When Marie traveled to the Indian art shows or the Indian Market in Santa Fe, she often took her family with her. There they met people from around the world who loved to collect their pottery. This instilled a sense of pride and unity throughout the Chino family. Marie’s descendants have carried on the tradition of making fine Acoma pottery.

Marie's work is held by the Albuquerque Museum, Holmes Museum of Anthropology, the Spurlock Museum, the National Museum of the American Indian and the National Museum of Women in the Arts in Washington, D.C.,

References and further reading

 Dillingham, Rick. (1994). Fourteen families in Pueblo pottery. Albuquerque: University of New Mexico. ISBN 0826314988. 
Dittert, Alfred E; Fred Plog (1980). Generations in Clay: Pueblo Pottery of the American Southwest. Flagstaff, AZ: Northland Press in cooperation with the American Federation of the Arts. ISBN 0873582713.

 Schaaf, Gregory. Southern Pueblo Pottery: 2,000 Artist Biographies.  2002.

External links
  Marie Z. Chino pottery at the Holmes Museum of Anthropology

1907 births
1982 deaths
Native American potters
Artists from New Mexico
People from Acoma Pueblo
Pueblo artists
20th-century American women artists
Native American women artists
Women potters
20th-century ceramists
American ceramists
American women ceramists
20th-century Native Americans
20th-century Native American women